El Port del Comte is a locality located in the municipality of La Coma i la Pedra, in Province of Lleida province, Catalonia, Spain. As of 2020, it has a population of 75.

Geography 
El Port del Comte is located 140km northeast of Lleida.

References

Populated places in the Province of Lleida